Tom Docherty (15 April 1924 – 28 December 2020) was an English professional footballer. A winger, he joined Newport County in 1955 from Reading and went on to make 108 appearances for Newport, scoring one goal. In 1958 he joined King's Lynn. He died in December 2020 at the age of 96.

References

External links

1924 births
2020 deaths
Association football wingers
English Football League players
English footballers
King's Lynn F.C. players
Lincoln City F.C. players
Newport County A.F.C. players
Norwich City F.C. players
Reading F.C. players